OmniGuide, Inc. is a private medical device company developing and commercializing  minimally-invasive surgical tools. Founded in 2000, OmniGuide's manufacturing facilities and executive offices are located in Lexington, Massachusetts, USA.  The Company’s manufacturing plant, located at OmniGuide’s headquarters in Lexington, Massachusetts, has manufacturing processes that are capable of manufacturing fibers with semiconductor level tolerances and microscopic layers in a scalable manner.

Technology
The technology is based on the revolutionary photonic bandgap fiber invented at MIT, published in Nature and Science and subsequently licensed exclusively to the company. The first flexible fiber-optic surgical scalpel capable of delivering CO2 laser light has been developed using this technology.

References

External links
 Omniguide Inc Website

Medical technology companies of the United States
Companies established in 2000
Companies based in Cambridge, Massachusetts
2000 establishments in Massachusetts